Gunvor Krogsæter (born 1 November 1933) is a Norwegian politician and member of the Liberal Party.

She served as a deputy representative to the Norwegian Parliament from Møre og Romsdal during the 1981–1985 term. In total she met during 26 days of parliamentary session.

References

1933 births
Living people
Liberal Party (Norway) politicians
Deputy members of the Storting
Place of birth missing (living people)
20th-century Norwegian women politicians
20th-century Norwegian politicians
Women members of the Storting